In 1966, the Transport Workers Union of America (TWU) and Amalgamated Transit Union (ATU) called a strike action in New York City after the expiration of their contract with the New York City Transit Authority (TA). It was the first strike against the TA; pre-TWU transit strikes in 1905, 1910, 1916, and 1919 against the then-private transit companies had all failed. There had also been some partial TWU strikes in the 1930s but no citywide actions. The strike led to the passage of the Taylor Law, which redefined the rights and limitations of unions for public employees in New York.

The strikers were led initially by the Irish-born Mike Quill, the TWU's founder, who had been the union's president since its founding. The strike effectively ended all service on the subway and buses in the city, affecting millions of commuters. It was an ominous beginning for the mayoralty of John V. Lindsay, but is perhaps better remembered for the jailing of Quill and for his death only weeks afterwards.

Chronology
The twelve-day strike began on New Year's Day; the last trains rolled at 8:02 am. An injunction to end the strike was issued later that day, under the 1947 Condon-Wadlin Act. On January 2, the union reduced its economic demands, but the TA responded only by getting a judge's order for the arrest of Quill and eight other union leaders. (The others were Matthew Guinan, Frank Sheehan, Daniel Gilmartin, Ellis Van Riper, and Mark Kavanagh of the TWU and John Rowland, William Mangus, and Frank Kleess of the ATU). The arrests were set for 1 a.m. on January 4. Quill was obviously in ill health, but immediately before his arrest he told reporters at the Americana Hotel, "The judge can drop dead in his black robes. I don't care if I rot in jail. I will not call off the strike."

Quill spent little time in jail: his poor health soon had him transferred to Bellevue Hospital and later to Mount Sinai Medical Hospital, leaving TWU Secretary-Treasurer Doug MacMahon (a close associate of Quill's, with him since the union's founding) to lead the strike. On January 10, 15,000 workers picketed City Hall. Negotiations moved forward through mediators, with movement from both sides. At 1:37 A.M. on January 13, MacMahon announced that the union was recommending settlement.

The package, worth over $60 million, included wages increases from $3.18 to $4.14 an hour, an additional paid holiday, increased pension benefits, and other gains. Gains averaged nine percent for the next eight years. Quill's health at first seemed to be improving; he was actually released from hospital January 25. He gave a speech to the victorious strikers and another press conference at the Americana, but the apparent improvement in his health was an illusion: he died on January 28.

Context
Democratic Party New York City mayor Robert F. Wagner Jr. granted collective bargaining rights to city employees in 1958. This led to the unions replacing Tammany Hall as the city's most powerful political force. Wagner formed a close alliance with the public-sector unions. John Lindsay, a reformist within the Republican Party, won the 1965 New York City mayoral election by campaigning against the city's often corrupt political machines. With the transit contract set to expire the same day Lindsay would take office, the stage was set for confrontation.

Lindsay's "Protestant rectitude" proved no match for the "fiery" Quill. The true sources of power in New York became clear, a point that would be further driven home by 1967 and 1968 teachers strikes and a 1968 strike by sanitation workers. By the time Lindsay ran for re-election in 1969 as the candidate of the Liberal Party of New York, he had made his peace with the public sector unions, and ultimately won their support.  However, and partly as a result, the city's social and economic decline was rapidly intensifying.

See also

 1980 New York City transit strike
 2005 New York City transit strike

Notes

References
 E.J. McMahon and Fred Siegel, Gotham's fiscal crisis: lessons unlearned (PDF). The Public Interest No. 158 (Winter 2005) p. 96-110.

New York City Transit Strike, 1966
New York City transit strike
1966 in New York City
New York City transit strikes
Transportation labor disputes in the United States
January 1966 events in the United States
Rail transportation labor disputes in the United States